Old Castle may refer to:
Old Castle (Stuttgart), a building in Stuttgart, Germany
Hohenbaden Castle in Baden-Baden, Germany
Old Castle (Rockport, Massachusetts), a historic house
The Old Castle, a movement from Pictures at an Exhibition by Modest Mussorgsky

See also 
Oldcastle (disambiguation)